Pentafluorophenol is the organofluorine compound (specifically a fluoroalcohol) with the formula C6F5OH. This is the perfluorinated analogue of phenol. It is a white odorless solid that melts just above room temperature. With a pKa of 5.5, it is one of the most acidic phenols.

Uses
Pentafluorophenol is used to prepare pentafluorophenyl esters, which are active esters useful in peptide synthesis.

Environmental hazards
Pentafluorophenol is considered hazardous because of oral, dermal and inhalation toxicity and because it causes "severe skin burns and eye damage."

References

Fluoroarenes
Perfluorinated compounds
Phenols